Dobloug is a surname. Notable people with the surname include:

Jørgen Dobloug (1945–2018), Norwegian artist
Mikkel Dobloug (politician) (1844–1913), Norwegian merchant, wholesaler, philanthropist, and politician
Mikkel Dobloug (skier) (born 1944), Norwegian Nordic combined skier